FYVE, RhoGEF and PH domain-containing protein 3 is a protein that in humans is encoded by the FGD3 gene.

References

Further reading

External links 
 PDBe-KB provides an overview of all the structure information available in the PDB for Human FYVE, RhoGEF and PH domain-containing protein 3 (FGD3)